Donna M. Loring is an author, broadcaster, and former Senior Advisor on Tribal Affairs to Janet Mills, the governor of Maine.

Early life 

Loring grew up on Indian Island, Maine, where she was raised by her grandmother. She received a Bachelor of Arts degree in Political Science from the University of Maine. She graduated from the Maine Criminal Justice Academy and, in 1984, became the police chief for the Penobscot nation, making her the Academy's first female graduate to become a police chief. From 1992 to 1997, Loring was the first female director of security at Bowdoin College.  During her service in Vietnam, she was stationed at the communications center at Long Binh Army base, fifty miles north of Saigon, where she processed all casualty reports of Southeast Asia. Former Maine Governor Angus King commissioned her to honorary Colonel rank, and he appointed her as Aide de Camp to advise him on women veteran's affairs. In 1999, she was given the Mary Ann Hartman Award, which recognizes Maine women for accomplishments in the arts, politics, business, education, and community services, from the Women in Curriculum and Women's Studies Program at the University of Maine.

Political career 

Maine is unique in having tribal representatives sit (in a non-voting capacity) in its state legislature. Following this tradition, which dates back to the 1800s, Loring served several terms on behalf of the Penobscots.  She supported a bill in 2000 to remove the word "squaw" from public site names.   One of Loring's major accomplishments was her writing and sponsorship of LD 291, "An Act to Require Teaching Maine Native American History and Culture in Maine’s Schools" which passed as a law in 2001.  Among her other achievements in the legislature, she created the first "State of the Tribes Address" in the history of Maine. Held in March 2002 and attended by tribal chiefs, the event was broadcast live on Maine Public Television and Radio. Loring also worked on a bill that proposed to extend the time period in which the tribe could purchase land for the Calais Casino. Finally, in April 2008, Loring put before the legislature HP 1681, "Joint Resolution in the Support of the United Nations Declaration on the Rights of Indigenous Peoples."   This passed unanimously, making Maine the only state in the country to pass such a resolution in favor of the UN Declaration of Indigenous Rights.

Loring is a former member of the Penobscot tribal council. In 2006, she served as a select person for the town of Richmond for almost a year before moving to Bradley.

Writing and public speaking 

Loring hosts a monthly radio show called "Wabanaki Windows" for WERU in Blue Hill, Maine.  She has long written about policy and Maine Indian history; but in recent years, she has turned to creative writing.  She published a memoir about her years in the Maine Legislature called In the Shadow of the Eagle (2008), which was favorably reviewed in a leading Native American Studies journal, among other sources.   After studying with the playwright William S. Yellow Robe, Jr., Loring also wrote a musical drama called "The Glooskape Chronicles: Creation and the Venetian Basket," which received national coverage in the newspaper Indian Country Today.

References

External links 
The Donna Loring Archive at the University of New England
In the Shadow of the Eagle at Tilbury House Publishers
LD 291, the education bill written by Donna Loring
Maine Folklife Center's Veterans Oral History Project, which interviewed Loring
Opinion Pieces by Loring on Indian Country Today Media Network
 Seven Eagles Media Productions, Loring's nonprofit group devoted to accurate Native representations
"Tribal-State Relations," Loring's invited commentary in the 2004 Maine Policy Review
"Wabanaki Windows," Loring's radio show on WERU, Blue Hill, Maine

1948 births
Living people
American broadcasters
United States Army personnel of the Vietnam War

American female military personnel of the Vietnam War
Chiefs of police
Penobscot people
People from Penobscot Indian Island Reservation
University of Maine alumni
Members of the Maine House of Representatives
American women writers
Writers from Maine
Women state legislators in Maine
Native American people from Maine
American LGBT military personnel
Female United States Army personnel
Native American United States military personnel
LGBT Native Americans
American LGBT writers
American LGBT broadcasters
LGBT law enforcement workers
LGBT state legislators in Maine
Native American writers
Native American women in warfare
20th-century American women
20th-century Native Americans
21st-century Native Americans
21st-century LGBT people
20th-century Native American women
21st-century Native American women